The Danuvia 39M/43M was a Hungarian submachine gun designed by Pál Király in the late 1930s and used during World War II.

History
The 9×25mm Danuvia submachine gun was designed by Hungarian engineer Pál Király in the late 1930s, and was produced by the titular Danuvia company. The guns were issued to Hungarian army troops in 1939 and remained in service throughout World War II and until the early 1950s. A total of roughly 8,000 were made between 1939 and 1945. The Danuvia was a large, sturdy weapon, similar to a carbine. Inspired by the SIG MKMS, the Danuvia used the more powerful 9×25mm Mauser round, and incorporated lever-delayed blowback in order to better manage this high energy cartridge. The Danuvia's magazine can be folded forward into a recess in the stock where a plate then slides over it.

The gun was well-liked by troops it was issued to; it reportedly functioned well in the sub-zero, muddy conditions on the Eastern Front. The only difficulty was the availability of 9×25mm Mauser ammunition. It was used by the Hungarian army, military police and police forces and stayed in service until the early 1950s when it was gradually replaced by the PPSh-41 and the Kucher K1.

Design
The Danuvia featured a patented two-part lever-delayed blowback bolt.  The fire selector switch is a circular cap on the rear of the receiver and is rotated to one of three settings: E (Egyes)(semiautomatic fire), S(Sorozat) (full automatic), or Z (Zárt)(the safety setting).  The ejection port and cocking handle are on the right side of the receiver. It had a ramp-type rear sight above the ejection port and a post foresight at end of the barrel.

Variants

The original Danuvia was the Géppisztoly (Submachine gun) 39M with a fixed wooden stock, which was followed in limited numbers by the Géppisztoly 39/A M with a folding wooden stock. In 1943 a new version with a forward folding metal stock, wood fore stock and a pistol grip was designated the Géppisztoly 43M. The 43M was the most produced version and had a shortened barrel and a forward-angled magazine.

References

External links
Kiraly 43M: Hungary's Overpowered Submachine Gun
submachine guns (en)
Modern Arms Entry

9×25mm Mauser submachine guns
Lever-delayed blowback firearms
Submachine guns of Hungary
Weapons and ammunition introduced in 1939
World War II infantry weapons
World War II submachine guns